Turňa nad Bodvou is a village and municipality in Košice-okolie District in the Kosice Region of eastern Slovakia.

History
In historical records the village was first mentioned in 1198. The capital of the historic county Torna County of the House of Keglević was Turňa Castle (Slovak: Turniansky hrad), later the town of Turňa nad Bodvou with a population of about 30'000 people in the year 1851. The town Turňa nad Bodvou became a village after the First World War and the Treaty of Trianon.

Geography
The village lies at an altitude of 180 metres and covers an area of 23.12 km². It has a population of about 3230 people.

Ethnicity
The majority of the population is almost evenly split between Slovaks (43.92%) and Hungarians (43.57%), with Romani (8.06%) as the largest minority (2001).

Government

The village has its own tax office and police force but the district office is located at Moldava nad Bodvou. It also has its own birth registering office.

Economy and facilities
The village also has developed medical facilities including a Pharmacy and outpatient facilities for children and adolescents and a gynaecologist.
The village also has a Slovakian bank and insurance branch.

Culture
The village has a public library and a DVD rental store.
The village is connected to cable television. The village also has a castle located on a hill by the village entrance named the Turnansky Hrad. There is little remaining of the structure as much of it was destroyed under the orders of Ceasar Leopold in the year 1685, and later in 1848, a fire brought down the roof. There is now only one wall and the remains of a turret left standing although this too is crumbling.

Sport
The village has a football pitch.

Transport
The village has a railway station and a bus stop at Turňa nad Bodvou

Gallery

Sources

External links
 Turňa nad Bodvou
http://www.statistics.sk/mosmis/eng/run.html

Villages and municipalities in Košice-okolie District
Hungarian communities in Slovakia